The Ottawa Sun is a daily  newspaper in Ottawa, Ontario, Canada. It is published by Sun Media. It began publication in 1983 as the Ottawa Sunday Herald, until it was acquired by (then) Toronto Sun Publishing Corporation in 1988. In April 2015, Sun Media papers were acquired by Postmedia.

A Sunday edition of the newly named Ottawa Sun began publication on September 4, 1988 and a daily publication started on November 7, 1988. As with its sister papers, it has a "Sunshine Girl" feature, although in the past it also contained a "Sunshine Boy" feature.

Past editors include Peter Worthington and Mark Bonokoski. The current editor-in-chief since 2016 is former managing editor of the Montreal Gazette, Michelle Richardson. Its editorials are often considered conservative-leaning.

See also
 List of newspapers in Canada

References

External links
 Ottawa Sun
 Ottawa Sun

Daily newspapers published in Ontario
Newspapers published in Ottawa
Postmedia Network publications
Publications with year of establishment missing
Conservative media in Canada